Mactan–Benito Ebuen Air Base, originally known as Mactan Air Base,  is an active military airbase of the Philippine Air Force (PAF).  It is located on the island of Mactan, Cebu, in the Visayas region of the Philippines.  It shares its single runway with the civilian Mactan–Cebu International Airport.  Mactan Air Base was originally built by, and was a facility of the United States Air Force (USAF), until the American military units left the country in 1991, whereby full and total control was handed over to the Philippine Air Force.

Location
Mactan–Benito Ebuen Air Base is located on Mactan island, adjacent to Lapu-Lapu City, in the province of Cebu in the Central Visayas region of the Philippines.  Mactan island is best known as being the location where the Spanish explorer, Ferdinand Magellan was killed by the forces of Lapu-lapu during his circumnavigation of the earth.

History
In 1945, Acorn 51 was assigned as the development unit for an airfield at Cebu.  The Seabees of the 54th Naval Construction Battalion were tasked with constructing the runway and support facilities.  After World War II, the American Strategic Air Command (SAC) were allocated Mactan as an emergency landing field in the event of a war.  The airfield was basically barren, with only a few permanent structures and a  concrete runway.  By 1965, the only permanent structures at the airfield were a Philippine Air Force (PAF) operations building; which also doubled as an airport terminal, and the PAF barracks.  There was also a squadron of PAF F-86s on base.

As the Vietnam War escalated, the base was rapidly built up.  At its height, it became a permanent C-130 base, housing at least the 772nd and 774th Troop Carrier Squadrons of the 463rd Troop Carrier Wing (later renamed as 'Tactical Airlift' Squadrons and Wing), as well as becoming a crew rest stop for C-124 and C-133 crews, in order to relieve congestion at Clark Air Base.  The C-124 Operations Squadron was the 606th Military Airlift Support Squadron (606th MASS).

After the end Vietnam War, the base was handed over to the Philippine Air Force.

During the Mindanao campaign in the 1970s, Mactan Air Base the base was extensively used for fighter operations against targets in Mindanao region by the Philippine Air Force.

In June 1996, Mactan Air Base was renamed Brigadier General Benito N. Ebuen Air Base in honour of Philippine Air Force General Benito N. Ebuen, a former PAF chief, who was killed in an aircrash or the Presidential Plane which was carrying Pres. Ramon Magsaysay .

In the aftermath of Super Typhoon Yolanda, Cebu airport was designated the hub of logistics for rescue and relief efforts, and the base saw a continuous flow of helicopters and jumbo cargo aircraft.  Each day, at least ten were parked in the base, including V-22 Ospreys of the US Marines, to C-130 transport aircraft of different air forces of countries extending aid.  Bigger aircraft like the C-5 Galaxy, C-17 Globemaster, 747 freighters, and An-124 landed in the base.

Current status
This Philippine Air Force (PAF) airbase is currently responsible for the Transport Wing, and provides for PAF operations in the Visayas area.

Stationed at the base in 2009 were the 208th Tactical Helicopter Squadron, 205th Tactical Operations Wing, and the 220th Airlift Wing, along with the 5052nd Search and Rescue Squadron of the 505th Search and Rescue Group, and the 1304th Dental Dispensary.  The Headquarters Administrative Squadron from the 205th Tactical Operations Wing, and the 560th Air Base Wing handle logistics.

References

External links

Air force installations of the Philippines
Buildings and structures in Lapu-Lapu City
Visayan history
Visayan landmarks
Airports established in 1956
1956 establishments in the Philippines